Dehesa de la Cepeda is an exclave in central Spain.

Belonging to the municipality of Santa María de la Alameda in the Madrid region, it is entirely bordered by territory of Castile and León, embedded in between the provinces of Ávila and Segovia.

Dehesa de la Cepeda is mostly pasture land.

See also

References

Enclaves and exclaves
Geography of the Community of Madrid
Geography of Castile and León